Jashore Airport  is a domestic airport in Jashore, Bangladesh. Operated and maintained by the Civil Aviation Authority, Bangladesh. It is also used by the Bangladesh Air Force as part of BAF Matiur Rahman Base and training airfield for the Bangladesh Air Force Academy. At present it has daily seven direct flight with Dhaka and a weekly flight with Cox's Bazar. It is the only operational airport of Khulna Division and the fifth busiest airport of Bangladesh.

History 
Jessore Airport established the Royal Air Force in 1940 to protect British India from Japanese aggression during World War II. When British India gained independence after World War II, the Government of Pakistan opened the airport as a base for the Pakistan Air Force. Later in 1951 Pakistan International Airlines started operating flights from Jessore to Dhaka, Karachi, Lahore and Chattogram. At that time he operated only two flights a week from Dhaka to Jessore. And from 1951 to March 1971, the airport was used jointly by Pakistan International Airlines and Pakistan Air Force. When the war of independence started in Bangladesh in March 1971, Pakistan Air Force started using it for conducting war activities. On 6 December 1971, a Joint force of the Indian Army and the Liberation Army invaded East Pakistan, causing extensive damage to the airport. And when the city of Jessore fell, the entire Jessore District, including the airport, came under the joint forces of the Indian Army and the Liberation Army. And the Indian Air Force compensates the airport and makes it usable. Later, when Bangladesh became independent in 1972, the Indian Air Force handed over to the Bangladesh Air Force and Biman Bangladesh Airlines resumed flights from Dhaka to Jessore.

Airlines and destinations

Passenger

Cargo

See also
 List of airports in Bangladesh

References

External links

 Civil Aviation Authority of Bangladesh: Airports

Airports in Bangladesh
World War II sites in India
Jashore District